The U.S. Virgin Islands did not participate in the November 8, 2016 general election because it is a territory and not a state. However, the five non-incorporated territories that send Delegates to the House of Representatives did participate in the presidential primaries.

In presidential caucuses, Virgin Islands voters expressed their preferences for the Democratic and Republican parties' respective nominees for president. Registered members of each party only voted in their party's primary, while voters who were unaffiliated chose any one primary in which to vote.

Caucuses

Republican caucuses 

The Republican convention took place on March 10, 2016.

Six of Virgin Islands' nine Republican delegates were elected during a presidential caucus. Territorial Caucuses met from noon to 6 p.m. Atlantic Standard Time on St. Croix, St. Thomas, and St. John as a Convention to vote for Presidential Preference and select at-large delegates to the Republican National Convention.

Three party leaders -- the National Committeeman, the National Committeewoman, and the chairman of the Virgin Islands's Republican Party -- attended the convention by virtue of their position. On election day all six delegates were voted to be uncommitted to the national convention in Ohio. This means that they will decide who to support at the convention. 
All 6 delegates were disqualified by the territorial party and were replaced.  Rubio received 2 delegates, 2 delegates were uncommitted, Ted Cruz received 1, and Donald Trump received 1.  This decision is being contested.

Democratic caucuses 

Seven of Virgin Islands' 12 Democratic delegates are pledged to presidential contenders based on the results of the voting in the Virgin Islands Territorial Convention. A mandatory 15 percent threshold is required in order for a presidential contender to be pledged National Convention delegates.

The At-Large delegates are to be pledged proportionally to presidential contenders based on the Caucus results on each of the three islands: four from St Thomas and St. John jointly, and three from St. Croix.

The Democratic Caucus took place on June 4, 2016.

See also 
 Democratic Party presidential debates, 2016
 Democratic Party presidential primaries, 2016
 Republican Party presidential debates, 2016
 Republican Party presidential primaries, 2016

References

External links
 RNC 2016 Republican Nominating Process 
 Green papers for 2016 primaries, caucuses, and conventions

Virgin Islands
2016